Laali is a 1997 Indian Kannada-language drama film directed, written and scripted by Dinesh Babu, starring Vishnuvardhan, Mohini and Shanthi Krishna in the lead roles. The film was produced by Rockline Venkatesh under his home production, Rockline Productions.

The film was critically acclaimed upon release and won laurels at the Karnataka State Film Awards. While the film won the Second Best Film award, the lead actor Vishnuvardhan was awarded the Karnataka State Film Award for Best Actor for the year 1997.

Plot
Krishna (Dr. Vishnuvardhan) is a well known architect. His only love is his daughter Anju (Mohini) and his life is filled with joy and happiness. Anju falls in love with Harish and her father is also happy with this. The film takes a twist when Anju begins to find a perfect bride for her lonely father and she finds her professor Shanthi as a suitable wife for Krishna. She invites the professor home and upon seeing Shanthi, Krishna is shocked. Later it is revealed that Shanthi is Krishna's wife and he left her and her family because of Anju and Anju is not his real daughter. He found her lying on the footpath and brought her home, which led to their separation. Now Anju knows that truth, brings Shanthi home and calls her mother, much to chagrin of Krishna. He feels she is stealing his daughter from him and enters into stress and dilemma. Harish feels that he is in stress, needs psychiatric help and calls him home. But the situation goes wrong and Anju tells them to leave her father alone and throws them out of their home. Later, knowing her mistake, she calls her mother back, but in vain. So she writes a letter and leaves the house. Krishna tries to find her everywhere, but fails. He comes back, but he sees Anju back home. She tells him that she will never leave him again. Krishna feels he punished Shanthi too much and calls her back. The film ends with all of them united together.

Cast
 Vishnuvardhan as Krishna
 Mohini as Anju
 Harish
 Shanthi Krishna
 Ramakrishna
 Harish
 Jyothi
 C. R. Simha
 Vinayak Joshi
 Vinaya Prasad in a guest appearance

Soundtrack
The music of the film was composed by V. Manohar and lyrics written by K. Kalyan.

References

External sources

 Laali Songs
 Laali en Replay (VF)

1997 films
1990s Kannada-language films
Indian drama films
Films scored by V. Manohar
Films directed by Dinesh Baboo